Das Beste von kurz nach früher bis jetze (The best from shortly after earlier until now) is a compilation album released by German rock band Die Ärzte on 26 August 1994. It consists of previously released studio, single, remix and live versions of Die Ärzte songs, along with four remixes originally created for this album.

The title refers to the title of Die Ärzte früher! (Die Ärzte earlier!), which was a compilation of songs pre-1984. This means, that Das Beste von kurz nach früher bis jetze is a compilation of songs from 1984-1994.

The booklet features commentaries by Bela and Farin. Rod had joined the band at the time, but with Rod, Die Ärzte had released only one album at the time and on this album there are three songs from that album (Die Bestie in Menschengestalt).

Track listing

Personnel
Farin Urlaub - guitar, vocals
Bela Felsenheimer - drums, vocals
Rodrigo González - bass, vocals
Hans Runge - bass
Hagen Liebing - bass

Producers
Uwe Hoffmann and Die Ärzte: 1, 6, 8, 10, 15, 17, 19 from CD 1; 3, 5-8, 11-13, 15 from CD 2
Die Ärzte: 2-4, 11, 12, 16 from CD 1; 10 from CD 2
Micky Meuser: 5, 13 from CD 1; 4, 14 from CD 2
Manne Praeker: 7, 9 (original), 14, 18 (original) from CD 1; 1 (original), 2, 9 from CD 2
Uwe Hoffmann: 9 (remix), 18 (remix) from CD 1; 1 (remix) from CD 2

Charts

Weekly charts

Year-end charts

References

Die Ärzte compilation albums
1994 compilation albums